The FSC A-30/40 was a Polish cab over van prototype made between 1968 and 1973 by FSC Lublin.

History 
Work on the successor of the Żuk and Nysa cars began in 1967. The new car was to be front - or four wheel drive, with a load capacity of 1400/1800 kg, depending on the version. The 30 series was powered by the Polski Fiat 125p engine, while the 40 series was powered by the S-21M engine (a modernized engine from the FSO Warszawa). There were planned versions: van, pickup truck, fire truck, minibus, specialist van, refrigerated truck, ambulance and off-road (4x4). The first three were to be produced in FSC Lublin, while the others in ZSD Nysa

In total, about 50 vehicles were made. Production on a larger scale was not undertaken. The implementation of the 30/40 family for high-volume production was associated with the necessity of large investment outlays

The only surviving prototype is in Museum of Technology in Warsaw.

Versions 
 ''Main sources:

30 Series

A-30: Panel van with a load capacity of 1400 kg
A-32: Pick-up truck with a load capacity of 1200 kg
A-34: Fire truck
A-35: Ambulance

40 Series

A-40: Panel van with a load capacity of 1800 kg
A-42: Pick-up truck with a load capacity of 1800 kg
A-43: 16-seater minibus
A-45: Ambulance

See also 
 UAZ-452 - similar off-road capable van
 Barkas B 1000
 RAF-2203
 Rocar TV
 Škoda 1203

References

Cab over vehicles
Cab over off-road vehicles
Cars of Poland
Vans
Pickup trucks
Minibuses
Ambulances
FSC vehicles
Science and technology in Poland